Daniel Charles-Alfred (9 May 1934 – 17 September 2020) was a French footballer from Martinique. He played defender during the 1950s and 60s. He appeared on the cover of France Football magazine in 1963.

Awards
Selection for France national team in 1964
Finalist in the 1960–61 Coupe de France with Nîmes Olympique

References

External links
 
 

1934 births
2020 deaths
Sportspeople from Fort-de-France
French people of Martiniquais descent
Martiniquais footballers
French footballers
France international footballers
Martinique international footballers
Association football defenders